American Legion Baseball is a variety of amateur baseball played by 13-to-19-year-olds in fifty states in the U.S. and Canada. More than 3,500 teams participate each year. The American Legion Department of South Dakota established the program in 1925 at Milbank, South Dakota.

Purpose
According to the American Legion, the purpose of American Legion Baseball is to give players "an opportunity to develop their skills, personal fitness, leadership qualities, and to have fun."

History
The league still stands behind the traditional values upon which it was founded in 1925. American Legion Baseball has taught hundreds of thousands of young Americans the importance of sportsmanship, good health and active citizenship. The program is also a promoter of equality, making teammates out of young athletes regardless of their income levels or social standings.

Community service has always been a core value of The American Legion. In 1925, this commitment was furthered to include a baseball program.

The first American Legion Baseball World Series was held in Philadelphia in 1926. Yonkers, New York, Post 321 beat a team from Pocatello, Idaho, capping off what appeared to be a successful first season.

The league, however, hit a few growing pains in its second year. In 1927, the Legion's national convention convened in Paris. With the organization's financial coffers stretched thin from the trip's expenses, the Legion couldn't fund a World Series. No champion was named and the future of American Legion Baseball looked bleak, as the inaugural season wound up costing more than originally planned.

But the Legion's Americanism director, Dan Sowers, worked to keep the league afloat. The tournament format needed $50,000, and Sowers was determined to raise it. Early in 1928, he went to an executive meeting for professional baseball, hoping to reach a sympathetic ear. He found one in Commissioner Kenesaw Mountain Landis, who pledged a $50,000 annual donation from Major League Baseball. Legion Baseball resumed in 1928, and by 1929 participants were coming from every state and the District of Columbia.

Major League Baseball and American Legion Baseball don't have a formal partnership, but the two owe each other a tremendous debt of gratitude. MLB has sponsored Legion Baseball almost since its inception, and Legion Baseball has returned the favor, churning out major league prospects since the alumni base has been old enough to be scouted.

Hall of Fame alumni
American Legion Baseball has had graduates go on to reach the National Baseball Hall of Fame.

Other notable American Legion alumni

World Series
In 2011, Shelby, North Carolina was named the permanent home of the American Legion World Series after decades of rotating venues for the event.

The format of the tournament for the eight teams involves separating into two pools and playing round robin within that pool from Thursday to Sunday. The top seed in each pool plays the runner-up in the other pool in the semifinals on Monday, with the two teams advancing to a one-game championship on Tuesday.

With games set at Keeter Stadium on the campus of Shelby High School, the local community has rallied around the event, turning it into a lengthy celebration including the Seventh Inning Stretch festival in Uptown Shelby the Saturday prior to the World Series, a Commander's Reception the Tuesday before the event and a Parade of Champions the night prior to the first game.

Attendance has swelled over the length of the tenure in Shelby, setting event records every year.
 2011 – 86,162
 2012 – 101,925
 2013 – 104,726
 2014 – 110,036
 2015 – 117,072
 2016 – 120,000

In addition to attendance in Shelby, all games are streamed online on ESPN3, with games Sunday, Monday and Tuesday broadcast nationally on ESPNU.

National champions

1926–1959

1960–1999

2000–present

State, sectional and regional tournaments
All 50 state champions, eight host sites, and the runners up from the six states with the most teams enrolled advance to the regional tournaments.
 Region 1 – Northeast: Connecticut, Maine, Massachusetts, New Hampshire, Vermont, Rhode Island
 Region 2 – Mid-Atlantic: Delaware, Maryland, New Jersey, New York, Pennsylvania, Virginia
 Region 3 – Southeast: Alabama, Florida, Georgia, North Carolina, South Carolina, Tennessee, West Virginia
 Region 4 – Mid-South: Arkansas, Kansas, Kentucky, Louisiana, Mississippi, Missouri, Oklahoma, Texas
 Region 5 – Great Lakes: Illinois, Indiana, Michigan,  Ohio, Wisconsin
 Region 6 – Central Plains: Iowa, Nebraska, North Dakota, South Dakota, Minnesota,
 Region 7 – Northwest: Alaska, Idaho, Montana, Oregon, Washington, Wyoming
 Region 8 – Western: Arizona, California, Colorado, Nevada, New Mexico, Utah, Hawaii

Awards
See footnotes.

 American Legion Graduate of the Year: "A Major League Baseball player, who is an American Legion Baseball alumnus, is honored each year with the American Legion Graduate of the Year award. The award recognizes character, leadership, playing abilities and community service."
 George W. Rulon Player of the Year: "The award is based on integrity, mental attitude, cooperation, citizenship, sportsmanship, scholastic aptitude and general good conduct."
 American Legion Batting Champion: Awarded "to the player with the highest batting average during national competition." (previously sponsored by Louisville Slugger)
 American Legion Big Stick Award: Presented "to the player who rounds the most bases in regional and national competition." (previously sponsored by Rawlings)
 Dr. Irvin L. "Click" Cowger RBI Memorial Award: Awarded to the player who "is credited with the most runs batted in at the regional tournament and World Series."
 Bob Feller Pitching Award: Presented to the pitcher "with the most strikeouts in regional and national competition."
 James F. Daniel Jr. Memorial Sportsmanship Award: Presented "to a player who participates in the Legion World Series and best embodies the principles of good sportsmanship."
 Jack Williams Memorial Leadership Award: Presented by "the Department of North Dakota ... to the manager and coach of the national championship team as outstanding representatives of adult leadership."

See also

 Amateur baseball in the United States
 
 South Dakota Amateur Baseball Hall of Fame

Notes

External links
 American Legion Baseball official website
 American Legion World Series official website
 Blog: All of Baseball: American Legion

American Legion
Youth baseball in the United States
Children's sport
Baseball governing bodies in the United States
Baseball in South Dakota
Sports organizations established in 1925